Sebastira is a genus of jumping spiders that was first described by Eugène Louis Simon in 1901.  it contains only two species, found only in Panama and Venezuela: S. instrata and S. plana.

References

Salticidae genera
Salticidae
Spiders of Central America
Spiders of South America